Rie Terazono (born January 31, 1981) is a female field hockey goalkeeper from Japan. She represented her native Asian country at the 2004 Summer Olympics in Athens, Greece.

References
 sports-reference

External links
 

1981 births
Living people
Japanese female field hockey players
Female field hockey goalkeepers
Field hockey players at the 2004 Summer Olympics
Olympic field hockey players of Japan
Asian Games medalists in field hockey
Field hockey players at the 2002 Asian Games
Field hockey players at the 2006 Asian Games
Asian Games silver medalists for Japan
Asian Games bronze medalists for Japan
Medalists at the 2002 Asian Games
Medalists at the 2006 Asian Games